{{DISPLAYTITLE:C19H24O3}}
The molecular formula C19H24O3 may refer to:

 Adrenosterone
 4-Androstene-3,6,17-trione
 Methoxyestrones
 2-Methoxyestrone
 4-Methoxyestrone
 Pirnabine
 Prallethrin
 Testolactone